Vladimir Đokić (born April 25, 1971) is a Serbian professional basketball coach and former player who is the head coach for Vršac of the Basketball League of Serbia.

Playing career 
A point guard, Đokić played 18 seasons in Yugoslavia, Slovakia, Hungary, Macedonia, and Serbia, between from 1990 and 2008. During his playing days, he played for Metalac, Spartak, Partizan, Crvena zvezda, Balkan Steel, Ergonom, EKF Eger, and Nitra. He retired as a player with Metalac in 2008.

Coaching career 
Đokić coached Serbian teams Mašinac, Sloboda, Sloga, Metalac and Vršac. On July 4, 2018, he was named as a head coach for Dynamic. On April 10, 2019, Dynamic parted ways with him. He is also known for coaching the winning team of the 2015 FIBA Europe Under-20 Championship.

On 27 September 2019, Đokić was named a head coach for Metalac. It is his second stint. He left Metalac in June 2021.

On 12 August 2021, Vršac hired Đokić as their new head coach. He parted ways with Vršac in March 2022.

References

External links
 Vladimir Đokić at eurobasket.com
 Vladimir Đokić at fiba.com

1971 births
Living people
KK Crvena zvezda players
KK Dynamic coaches
KK Ergonom players
KK Metalac coaches
KK Metalac Valjevo players
KK Partizan players
KK Sloboda Užice coaches
KK Spartak Subotica players
KK Mašinac coaches
KK Sloga coaches
KK Vršac coaches
Serbian expatriate basketball people in North Macedonia
Serbian expatriate basketball people in Slovakia
Serbian expatriate basketball people in Hungary
Sportspeople from Valjevo
Serbian men's basketball coaches
Serbian men's basketball players
Point guards